Elbessos was a town of ancient Lycia, which was mentioned in a treaty between Caesar and the Lycian League.
 
Its site is located on Girdev Gölü, Asiatic Turkey.

References

Populated places in ancient Lycia
Former populated places in Turkey